The mixed doubles tennis event at the 2022 Pacific Mini Games took place at the American Memorial Park and Pacific Islands Club in Saipan, Northern Mariana Islands from 19 to 25 June 2022.

Schedule

Seeds
All seeds per ATP rankings.

Results

Finals

Top half

Section 1

Section 2

Bottom half

Section 3

Section 4

References

External links
Official website

2022 Pacific Mini Games